Elafos may refer to several places in Greece:

Elafos, Ioannina, a village in the Dodoni
Elafos, Larissa, a village in the Agia
Elafos, Pieria, a village in the Katerini